Lisa Raymond and Rennae Stubbs were the defending champions and successfully defended their title, defeating Els Callens and Roberta Vinci 6–1, 6–1 in the final.

It was the 29th title for Raymond and the 33rd title for Stubbs in their respective careers. It was also the 2nd title for the pair during this season.

Seeds

Draw

Draw

References
 Main and Qualifying Draws

Toray Pan Pacific Open – Doubles
2002 Toray Pan Pacific Open